The anterior choroidal artery originates from the internal carotid artery. However, it may (rarely) arise from the middle cerebral artery.

Structure
The anterior choroidal artery originates from the distal carotid artery 5 mm after the origin of the posterior communicating artery and just before the carotid terminus. It serves structures in the prosencephalon, diencephalon, and mesencephalon: 
 choroid plexus of the lateral ventricle and third ventricle
 optic chiasm and optic tract
 internal capsule
 lateral geniculate body
 globus pallidus
 tail of the caudate nucleus
 hippocampus
 amygdala
 substantia nigra
 red nucleus
 crus cerebri

Clinical significance
The full extent of the damage caused by occlusion of the anterior choroidal artery is not known. However, studies show that the interruption of blood flow from this vessel can result in hemiplegia on the contralateral (opposite) side of the body, contralateral hemi-hypoesthesia, and homonymous hemianopsia.  These symptoms are thought to arise from ischemic damage to the posterior limb of the internal capsule, thalamus, and optic chiasm/optic tract. However, the posterior limb of the internal capsule also receives lenticulostriate arteries from the middle cerebral artery, thus creating partially redundant supply.

See also 

Plexal point

References

External links

 
 
 Blood supply at neuropat.dote.hu
 http://neuroangio.org/anatomy-and-variants/anterior-choroidal-artery/

Arteries of the head and neck